Taipei Economic and Cultural Representative Office in Peru represents the interests of Taiwan in Peru, acting as a de facto embassy in the absence of diplomatic relations. The office is also accredited in Bolivia.

The office is responsible for promoting bilateral relations between Taiwan and Peru at various levels, as well as handling consular-related businesses and providing services for overseas Chinese and emergency assistance for foreigners.

The representative office of the Peruvian government in Taiwan is the Commercial Office of Peru to Taipei.

History

Embassy of China, Lima (1880s–1971)

Peru established relations with the Qing dynasty with the signing of a treaty in Tianjin on June 26, 1874. Peru's first Resident Ambassador was named the next year, assuming his duties on May 20, 1878, while the Chinese ambassador would only reach Peru in 1883, after the War of the Pacific.

In 1971, the left-wing government of Juan Velasco Alvarado recognized the People's Republic of China instead of the Republic of China, leading to the latter rupturing its relations with Peru and closing its embassy.

Taipei Economic and Cultural Representative Office (1978–present)
In 1978, the Republic of China established the Far East Trade Center in Peru in Lima.  A former location was located at Av. Benavides 1780.

President Alberto Fujimori approved Supreme Executive Order No. RE014, agreeing to change the name of "Far East Trade Center" to "Taipei Economic and Cultural Office in Peru". On March 3, 1994, Peru established a "Taipei Trade Office" in Taiwan.

See also
Peru–Taiwan relations
List of diplomatic missions of Taiwan
Embassy of China, Lima

Notes

References

Bibliography
 

China
Peru
Peru–Taiwan relations